Antero Saldaña (November 17, 1958 – February 1, 2023) was a Filipino professional basketball player who played his entire career in the Philippine Basketball Association.

Player profile
Coming straight from the MICAA, Saldaña was signed to a rookie contract by Toyota in 1982. He would have become the PBA Rookie of the Year awardee in 1982 had he not figured in a brawl against the visiting South Korean national team (led by Lee Chung-hee) in the 1982 PBA Invitationals. Although he was leading the rookie stats race, he was disqualified and Marte Saldaña (no relation) of San Miguel, won the honor instead.  Back then, he was said to have been the youngest player to join the PBA at 17 years old. However, after closer scrutiny, it turned out that Saldana was at least 4 years older than his claimed age.

Saldaña was known for his blue-collar work on the hardcourt, defending the opposing team's best player, collaring rebounds on both ends, diving for loose balls, setting up bone-crunching picks to free his teammates and even acting as the team enforcer.  He was also a very capable scorer, with an accurate perimeter jumper and excellent pivot moves.  Early in his career, he was known as the "Plastic Man" for his twisting hang-time shots inside the paint. In his first year with the Gilbey's Gin team in 1983, Saldaña easily emerged as the team's top local performer, leading his team in scoring and rebounding, thus, becoming the very first Most Improved Player Awardee in the PBA.

In 1987, Saldaña suffered one of the most gruesome injuries in the PBA when he overextended and violently twisted his knee when he landed badly while trying to block a shot attempt by, ironically, his namesake Marte Saldańa, then of Hills Bros. Coffee.  He, however, miraculously recovered from what many perceived as a career-ending injury and even went on to play for at least 16 seasons in the PBA as a power forward. He may have been a journeyman, having played for at least six different PBA teams but there’s no denying how coaches appreciated his game. In his late 30s, he remained a key player for Gordon’s Gin’s successful championship bid in the 1997 PBA Commissioner's Cup Finals against Alaska. In 2000, he suited up for Red Bull when he was about 42 years old, one of the very few PBA players to play at age 40.

Death
Saldaña died on February 1, 2023, nearly 23 years after he retired, following a "lingering kidney ailment". He was 64.

References

1958 births
2023 deaths
Deaths from kidney disease
Filipino men's basketball players
Barangay Ginebra San Miguel players
Toyota Super Corollas players
UST Growling Tigers basketball players
Basketball players from Manila
Centers (basketball)
Power forwards (basketball)
Alaska Aces (PBA) players
Pop Cola Panthers players
Shell Turbo Chargers players
Barako Bull Energy Boosters players